Mexborough Greyhound Stadium  also called the Dog Daisy Stadium was a greyhound racing stadium located in Mexborough, South Yorkshire.

Origins
The stadium was constructed on farmland north of the town of Mexborough and was accessed from tracks heading from Adwick Road (from the west) and Harlington Road (from the south). The stadium is believed to have been constructed during the 1930s and applied for a betting licence in 1935 under the 1934 Betting and Lotteries Act.

Greyhound racing
The racing was independent (not affiliated to the sports governing body the National Greyhound Racing Club).

Closure
The track closed during 1965 and was demolished to make way for housing.

References

Defunct greyhound racing venues in the United Kingdom